The following lists of events is scheduled to happen during 2019 in Nigeria.

Incumbents

Federal government
 President: Muhammadu Buhari (APC)
 Vice President: Yemi Osinbajo (APC)
 Senate President: Bukola Saraki (PDP) (Until 11 June); Ahmed Lawan (APC) (Starting 11 June)
 House Speaker: Yakubu Dogara (PDP) (Until 12 June); Femi Gbajabiamila (APC) (Starting 12 June)
 Chief Justice: Walter Samuel Nkanu Onnoghen (Until 25 January); Ibrahim Tanko Muhammad (Starting 25 January)

Governors
 Abia State: Okezie Ikpeazu (PDP) 
 Adamawa State: Bindo Jibrilla (APC) (until 29 May); Ahmadu Umaru Fintiri (PDP) (starting 29 May)
 Akwa Ibom State: Udom Emmanuel (PDP) 
 Anambra State: Willie Obiano (APGA)
 Bauchi State: M. A. Abubakar (APC) (until 29 May); Bala Abdulkadir Mohammed (PDP) (starting 29 May)
 Bayelsa State: Henry Dickson (PDP)
 Benue State: Samuel Ortom (APC)
 Borno State: Kashim Shettima (APC) (until 29 May); Babagana Umara Zulum (APC) (starting 29 May)
 Cross River State: Ben Ayade (PDP) 
 Delta State: Ifeanyi Okowa (PDP) 
 Ebonyi State: Dave Umahi (PDP)
 Edo State: Godwin Obaseki (PDP) 
 Ekiti State: Kayode Fayemi (APC) 
 Enugu State: Ifeanyi Ugwuanyi (PDP) 
 Gombe State: Ibrahim Dankwambo (PDP) (until 29 May); Muhammad Inuwa Yahaya (APC) (starting 29 May)
 Imo State: Rochas Okorocha (APC) (until 29 May); Emeka Ihedioha (PDP) (starting 29 May)
 Jigawa State: Badaru Abubakar (APC)
 Kaduna State: Nasir el-Rufai (APC) 
 Kano State: Umar Ganduje (APC) 
 Katsina State: Aminu Masari (APC) 
 Kebbi State: Abubakar Atiku Bagudu (APC)
 Kogi State: Yahaya Bello (APC)
 Kwara State: Abdulfatah Ahmed (APC) (until 29 May); Abdulrazaq Abdulrahman (APC) (starting 29 May)
 Lagos State: Akinwumi Ambode (APC) (until 29 May); Babajide Sanwo-Olu (APC) (starting 29 May) 
 Nasarawa State: Umaru Al-Makura (APC) (until 29 May); Abdullahi Sule (APC) (starting 29 May)
 Niger State: Abubakar Sani Bello (APC) 
 Ogun State: Ibikunle Amosun (APC) (until 29 May); Dapo Abiodun (APC) (starting 29 May)
 Ondo State: Oluwarotimi Odunayo Akeredolu (PDP)
 Osun State: Gboyega Oyetola (APC)
 Oyo State: Abiola Ajimobi (APC) (Until 29 May) Seyi Makinde (PDP) (Starting 29 May)
 Plateau State: Simon Lalong (APC) 
 Rivers State: Ezenwo Nyesom Wike (PDP)
 Sokoto State: Aminu Tambuwal (APC) 
 Taraba State: Darius Ishaku (PDP) 
 Yobe State: Ibrahim Geida (APC) (Until 29 May) Mai Mala Buni (APC) (Starting 29 May)
 Zamfara State: Abdul-aziz Yari Abubakar (APC) (Until 29 May) Bello Matawalle (PDP) (Starting 29 May)

Events

February
10-11: 2019 Kaduna State massacre.
2019 Nigerian general election was on 16 February 2019 to elect the President and the National Assembly. They were the sixth quadrennial elections since the end of military rule in 1999. Presidential primaries are likely to be held during the last six months of 2018.

May
President Muhammadu Buhari was inaugurated.

September
September 30 — Police rescued women in Lagos who were forced to sell babies.

December
December 13 - Action Against Hunger says four of six aid workers held by ISIL in the Islamic State's Central Africa Province since July have been killed.
December 18 − Citizens express alarm over new social media bill.
December 27 – Islamic State of Iraq and the Levant (ISIL)-linked propaganda arm Amaq releases a video showing the execution of 11 Christians.

Deaths

See also
List of Nigerian films of 2019
Nigerian general election, 2019

References

 
2010s in Nigeria
Nigeria
Nigeria
Years of the 21st century in Nigeria